Ntopile Kganyago (died 17 July 2013) was a South African politician who was a member of the National Assembly of South Africa from 2004. He was a member of the United Democratic Movement and served as the party's deputy president. He was Public Works Deputy Minister from 2004 to 2009. He died in hospital in Centurion, Gauteng on 17 July 2013.

References

United Democratic Movement (South Africa) politicians
Year of birth missing
2013 deaths